Pokemouche is a Mi'kmaq word and may refer to the following in the Canadian province of New Brunswick:

Pokemouche River, a tributary of the Gulf of Saint Lawrence
Pokemouche 13, New Brunswick, properly known as Pokemouche Indian Reserve No. 13, an Indian reserve located along the southern bank of the river
Pokemouche, New Brunswick, a local service district straddling the river; includes the community of Pokemouche
Pokemouche Airport, an airport located in Village-Blanchard, north of Pokemouche
Baie de Pokemouche, a bay near the mouth of the Pokemouche River
Baie de Petit-Pokemouche, a bay to the northeast of the Pokemouche River
Baie du Petit Pokemouche, an LSD in Shippegan Parish, New Brunswick
Pokemouche Gully, a channel forming the mouth of the Pokemouche River
Pokemouche Landing, an unincorporated community east of Saint-Sauveur